Asphondylia neomexicana is a species of gall midges in the family Cecidomyiidae.

References

Further reading

External links

 

Cecidomyiinae
Insects described in 1896

Diptera of North America
Taxa named by Theodore Dru Alison Cockerell
Gall-inducing insects